Hednota opulentellus is a moth in the family Crambidae. It was described by Zeller in 1863. It is found in Australia, where it has been recorded from Tasmania, New South Wales and Victoria.

References

Crambinae
Moths described in 1863